Anu Vaidyanathan is a filmmaker, comedian and engineer whose memoir Anywhere But Home was long-listed for the Mumbai Film Festival's word-to-screen market in 2016. 

She made her Off-Broadway debut with solo BC:AD (Before Children, After Diapers) show at the Kraine Theater on January 12th, 2023. 

Anu is taking two feature scripts to the market this year. One is a bilingual film in Tamil and English — a satirical thriller with a bit of action. The protagonist is a woman who is a complete badass. 

She is also the first Indian to complete Ironman Triathlon, doing so in 2006.

Early life 

Vaidyanathan was born in New Delhi, India. Vaidyanathan earned Bachelor of Science and Master of Science degrees in Computer Engineering from Purdue University and North Carolina State University. She pursued her PhD in Electrical Engineering from  University of Canterbury, Christchurch, New Zealand.

Career

In 2009, while working towards her PhD, she became the first Asian woman to complete the Ultraman Canada event. She is the first India-based athlete to train for an participate in Ironman Triathlon. Vaidyanathan was the first Indian woman to have qualified for the Half Ironman 70.3 Clearwater World Championship in 2008

She has served as the visiting faculty at IIM Ahmedabad and IIT Ropar. Her memoir Anywhere But Home – Adventures in Endurance, was published in 2016.

See also
 Sports in India

References

External links 
 Official website

Living people
People from New Delhi
1984 births
Indian female triathletes